Noga Hareuveni (1924–2007) was an Israeli botanist and scholar of Judaic studies. In 1994 Noga Hareuveni was awarded the Israel Prize for his leading role in the creation of the Biblical garden and nature preserve named Neot Kedumim.

Early life and education
Noga Hareuveni's parents, Ephraim and Hannah Hareuveni, were botanists who emigrated from Russia to Ottoman Palestine in 1912. They collected and classified plants that were mentioned in the Holy Scriptures of Judaism. On the Mount Scopus campus of Jerusalem's Hebrew University, they maintained the Museum of Biblical and Talmudic Botany, until it was destroyed in the 1948 war. After earning a master's degree in botany and Judaic studies, Noga Hareuveni developed a field survival course for training the Hagana and Palmach, Israel's pre-state military organizations. After 1948, he taught the same program to the Israel Defense Forces.

Career
In the 1960s Hareuveni realized his parents' dream of establishing a botanical reserve of biblical plants, which is today called Neot Kedumim. On 253 hectares, the staff of the botanical reserve now cultivates tens of thousands of trees and other plants. Great Lebanon cedars are the most impressive of the trees.

Selected publications

References

1924 births
2007 deaths
Israeli botanists
Judaic scholars